Denis Yuryevich Kavlinov (born 10 January 1995) is a Russian football player who plays for Taraz.

Club career
He made his debut in the Russian Professional Football League for FC Krasnodar-2 on 4 August 2013 in a game against FC Druzhba Maykop.

He made his Russian Football National League debut for FC Khimki on 17 July 2018 in a game against FC Luch Vladivostok.

References

External links

1995 births
People from Elista
Sportspeople from Kalmykia
Living people
Russian footballers
Association football goalkeepers
Russian expatriate footballers
Expatriate footballers in Belarus
Expatriate footballers in Kazakhstan
FC Krasnodar-2 players
FC Krasnodar players
FC Dynamo Saint Petersburg players
FC Kuban Krasnodar players
FC Rotor Volgograd players
FC Khimki players
FC Gomel players
FC Caspiy players
FC Zhetysu players
FC Taraz players
Russian First League players
Russian Second League players
Belarusian Premier League players
Kazakhstan Premier League players